The 1943–44 season was the 5th year of wartime football by Rangers.

Results
All results are written with Rangers' score first.

Southern League

Southern League Cup

See also
 1943–44 in Scottish football
 1943–44 Southern League Cup (Scotland)

Rangers F.C. seasons
Rangers
Scottish football championship-winning seasons